Canada and the United States have one land dispute over Machias Seal Island (off the coast of Maine), and four other maritime disputes in the Arctic and Pacific. Although they share the longest international border in the world, the two countries have a long history of disputes about the border's demarcation (see Canada–United States border).

Current disputes
The area is patrolled by the Canadian and US Coast Guard, but only Canadian Coast Guard occupies the lighthouse. The unresolved maritime boundary breaks into two elements: the sovereignty of the island and the location of the maritime boundary taking into account who is the rightful owner of the island.
 Strait of Juan de Fuca (Washington state and British Columbia): At the mouth of the strait, both countries declared fishing zones in 1977. Each country used a mildly differing method to define an equidistant water boundary.
 Yukon–Alaska dispute, Beaufort Sea (Alaska and Yukon) Canada supports an extension into the sea of the land boundary between Yukon and Alaska. The U.S. does not, but instead supports a line equidistant with respect to the coastline. Such a demarcation means that a minor portion claimed by Canada as Northwest Territories Exclusive Economic Zone (EEZ) is also claimed by the US, because the EEZ boundary between Northwest Territories and Yukon follows a straight north-south line into the sea. The U.S. claims would create a triangular shaped EEZ for Yukon/Canada. The precise translation of a phrase in the Anglo-Russian Convention of 1825, which was written in French, is part of the issue. The convention makes reference to the 141st Meridian "in its prolongation as far as the Frozen ocean." The authentic text is in French: "dans son [sic] prolongation jusqu’à la Mer Glaciale." The precise question is the interpretation that should be given to the preposition "jusqu’à." Specifically, is it inclusive or exclusive of the object to which the preposition relates?
 Northwest Passage: Canada claims the passage as part of its "internal waters" belonging to Canada, while the United States regards it as an "international strait" (a strait accommodating open international traffic). The Canadian Coast Guard and Royal Canadian Navy have commissioned a new ice breaker along with multiple offshore patrol ships to guard and patrol the waters.
 Dixon Entrance (Alaska and British Columbia) contains two water areas that are mutually claimed by Canada and the U.S. A line known as the "A-B" Line was defined in a 1903 arbitration decision on the Alaska/British Columbia boundary. The court specified the initial boundary point (Point "A") at the northern end of Dixon Entrance and designated Point "B" 72 NM to the east. Canada relies on the "A-B" line as rendering nearly all of Dixon Entrance as its internal waters. The U.S. does not recognize the "A-B" line as an official boundary, instead regarding it as allocating sovereignty over the land masses within the Dixon Entrance, with Canada's land south of the line. The U.S. regards the waters as subject to international marine law, and in 1977 it defined an equidistant territorial line throughout Dixon Entrance, mainly to the south of the "A-B" line. The intersecting lines create four separate water areas with differing claim status. The other two water areas are north of the "A-B" line and are not claimed by either country. In addition, Nunez Rocks is a low-tide elevation (LTE) ("bare at half-tide") that lies south of the "A-B" Line, surrounded by the sea territory claimed by the U.S. The United States has not ratified the Law of the Sea Treaty, although it adheres to most of its principles as customary international law. Under the treaty, LTEs may be used as basepoints for a territorial sea, and the U.S. uses Nunez Rocks as a basepoint. As a non-signatory, however, there is nothing preventing the U.S. from claiming areas beyond the scope of the Law of the Sea Treaty. The fact remains that, for about half of each day, above-water territory that Canada regards as Canadian is surrounded by sea territory that the U.S. has declared to be American.

Historical disputes
 Alaska boundary dispute (Alaska/British Columbia and Yukon) lasted 1821 to 1903
 Atlin District
 Bering Sea Arbitration lasted 1881 to 1893.
 Aroostook War (Maine/New Brunswick), a bloodless dispute that lasted from 1838 to 1839, leading to the Webster–Ashburton negotiations.
 Republic of Madawaska (Maine/New Brunswick), putative state in 1827, within territory that became part of New Brunswick in 1842.
 Oregon boundary dispute (Columbia District and New Caledonia/Oregon Country)
 Pig War (Colony of Vancouver Island/Washington Territory) took place in 1859
 Republic of Indian Stream (New Hampshire/Lower Canada) unrecognized state from 1832 to 1835. Now part of New Hampshire.

Coordinates 
 Machias Seal Island 
 North Rock 
 Strait of Juan de Fuca 
 Dixon Entrance 
 Beaufort Sea

See also

Colonial history of the United States
Former colonies and territories in Canada
Territorial evolution of Canada after 1867
List of territorial disputes

References

Canada geography-related lists

Canada And The United States
Lists of places in the United States